Solanum melissarum is a small tree or shrub in the flowering plant family Solanaceae endemic to Brazil.

Description
A small tree, from 1 to 6 metres high, usually with a single trunk.  The crown of light branches carries simple, unlobed leaves. The flowering inflorescence is from 5 cm to 30 cm long, and carries 4 to 20 long, narrow flower buds. The narrow, slightly membranous flower petal are green-white. The petals curve upward at first opening, and become lax as the flower ages. The anthers are at first purple, changing to yellow-orange with age.

Reproductive biology 
The pendulous flowers have poricidal anthers close to the stigma, with membranous thecae joined by a connective bearing osmophores that attract males of Euglossa cordata bees. As they collect fragrances, the bees press the thecae and pollen is released through a bellows mechanism. Based on the hand-pollination treatments, this species is self-incompatible.

References

melissarum
Flora of Brazil
Near threatened plants
Taxonomy articles created by Polbot